Eva Sisth (October 16, 1940 – October 7, 2019) was a Swedish sprint canoer who competed in the mid-1960s. At the 1964 Summer Olympics, she finished sixth in the K-2 500 m event.

References
Eva Sisth's profile at Sports Reference.com
Eva Sisth's profile at the Swedish Olympic Committee 

1940 births
2019 deaths
Canoeists at the 1964 Summer Olympics
Olympic canoeists of Sweden
Swedish female canoeists